was a Japanese businessman, central banker and the 12th Governor of the Bank of Japan (BOJ).

Early life
Hijikata was born in Mie Prefecture.

Career
In  1897, Hijikata was a BOJ trainee along with Junnosuke Inoue.  Both young men were sent by the bank to learn about British banking practices in London.

In 1918, Hijikata was named head of the Industrial Bank of Japan.

Hijikata was Governor of the Bank of Japan from June 12, 1928 through June 4, 1935.  During his tenure, financial difficulties in Europe and the suspension of the gold standard by the United Kingdom affected Japan; and the situation was exacerbated by the "Manchurian disturbance".

Notes

References
 Metzler, Mark. (2006). Lever of Empire: the International Gold Standard and the Crisis of Liberalism in Prewar Japan. Berkeley: University of California Press. ;  OCLC 469841628
 Tamaki, Norio. (1995). Japanese banking: a History, 1859-1959. Cambridge: Cambridge University Press. ;  OCLC 231677071

1871 births
1942 deaths
Governors of the Bank of Japan
Japanese bankers
People from Mie Prefecture